Benthonella is a genus of minute sea snails, marine gastropod mollusks or micromollusks in the family Rissoidae.

Species
Species within the genus Benthonella include:
 † Benthonella alvaniformis Lozouet, 2014 
 † Benthonella bearnensis Lozouet, 2014 
 † Benthonella brontodes Lozouet, 1990 
 Benthonella decorata (Thiele, 1925)
 † Benthonella loriei Weisbord, 1962 
 † Benthonella lutetiana Lozouet, 2014 
 Benthonella margaritifera (Watson, 1886)
 † Benthonella priabonica Lozouet, 2014 
 Benthonella sculpta (Thiele, 1925)
 Benthonella tenella (Jeffreys, 1869)
 Species brought into synonymy
 Benthonella fischeri Dall, 1889: synonym of Benthonella tenella (Jeffreys, 1869)
 Benthonella gaza Dall, 1889: synonym of Benthonella tenella (Jeffreys, 1869)
 Benthonella jeffreysi (Dautzenberg, 1889): synonym of Benthonella tenella (Jeffreys, 1869)
 Benthonella kullenbergi Odhner, 1960: synonym of Benthonella tenella (Jeffreys, 1869) 
 Benthonella nisonis Dall, 1889: synonym of Thaleia nisonis' (Dall, 1889)

References

 Gofas, S.; Le Renard, J.; Bouchet, P. (2001). Mollusca, in: Costello, M.J. et al. (Ed.) (2001). European register of marine species: a check-list of the marine species in Europe and a bibliography of guides to their identification. Collection Patrimoines Naturels, 50: pp. 180–213
 Spencer, H.; Marshall. B. (2009). All Mollusca except Opisthobranchia''. In: Gordon, D. (Ed.) (2009). New Zealand Inventory of Biodiversity. Volume One: Kingdom Animalia. 584 pp

External links
 Dall W.H. 1889. Reports on the results of dredging, under the supervision of Alexander Agassiz, in the Gulf of Mexico (1877-78) and in the Caribbean Sea (1879-80), by the U.S. Coast Survey Steamer "Blake", Lieut.-Commander C.D. Sigsbee, U.S.N., and Commander J.R. Bartlett, U.S.N., commanding. XXIX. Report on the Mollusca. Part 2, Gastropoda and Scaphopoda. Bulletin of the Museum of Comparative Zoölogy at Harvard College, 18: 1-492, pls. 10-40
 Jeffreys, J. G. (1870). Mediterranean Mollusca. Annals and Magazine of Natural History. (4)6: 65-86
 au/journal/Ponder-1985-Rec-Aust-Mus-Suppl-4-1221/ Ponder W. F. (1985). A review of the Genera of the Rissoidae (Mollusca: Mesogastropoda: Rissoacea). Records of the Australian Museum supplement 4: 1-221

Rissoidae
Gastropod genera